Megiddo Airfield , known as Shachar 7 by the Israel Defense Forces, is an Israeli airfield located in the Jezreel Valley near Tel Megiddo and  southwest of Afula. Opened in 1942 as RAF Station Megiddo and was used as an auxiliary field to RAF Station Ramat David. It currently handles private and agricultural flights. It formerly served as an Israeli Air Force base and was decommissioned in the mid-1980s.

On October 11, 1989, a Syrian MiG-23MLD defected to Israel, landing at Megiddo. The aircraft was afterwards flown by IAF's Flight Test Center and is now on display in the IAF museum in Hatzerim.

In April 2006, Jezreel Valley Regional Council announced that an international airport will be constructed in Megiddo in cooperation with a number of authorities. The new airport will be located on a 400 dunam (400,000 m2, 100 acres) site and construction is to cost $35 million. Officials report that the airport will undoubtedly increase tourism to the Jezreel Valley and surrounding areas.

External links

Megiddo at Airports Worldwide

Airports in Israel